Carver Theater or Carver Theatre may refer to:

in the United States (by state)
 Carver Theatre (Birmingham, Alabama), now known as the Carver Performing Arts Center
 Carver Theatre (Columbia, South Carolina)
 Carver Theater (New Orleans), listed on the NRHP in Orleans Parish, Louisiana
 Carver Theater (Washington, D.C.)